The 1848 United States presidential election in Rhode Island took place on November 7, 1844, as part of the 1848 United States presidential election. Voters chose four representatives, or electors to the Electoral College, who voted for President and Vice President.

Rhode Island voted for the Whig candidate, Zachary Taylor, over Democratic candidate Lewis Cass and Free Soil candidate former president Martin Van Buren. Taylor won the state by a margin of 28.09%.

With 60.77% of the popular vote, Rhode Island would prove to be Taylor's strongest state in the election in terms of percentage in the popular vote.

Results

See also
 United States presidential elections in Rhode Island

References

Rhode Island
1848
1848 Rhode Island elections